John Newman may refer to:

Religion
John Henry Newman (1801–1890), Anglican and Roman Catholic theologian, cardinal and saint
John Philip Newman (1826–1899), Bishop of the Methodist Episcopal Church

Politics and law
John Newman (mayor) ( – 1901), American politician
John Pretyman Newman (1871–1947), British Conservative politician, MP for Enfield and Finchley
John Newman (Australian politician) (1946–1994), Australian politician, assassinated by a rival
Jon O. Newman (born 1932), U.S. federal judge
John Henry Martey Newman, Ghanaian administrator and lawyer

Sports
John Newman (ice hockey) (1910–1967), professional ice hockey player
Johnny Newman (footballer) (born 1933), English former footballer and football manager
Johnny Newman (born 1963), American basketball player
Sam Newman (John Noel William Newman, born 1945), Australian television personality and ex-Australian rules footballer
John Newman III (born 1999), American basketball player
John Lunn Newman, English high jumper

Others
John Newman (explorer) ( – 1838), member of the Lewis and Clark Expedition
John Newman (architect) (1786–1859), English architect and antiquarian
Nick Newman (naval architect) (John Nicholas Newman, born 1935), American naval architect
John Newman (architectural historian) (born 1936)
John Newman (scientist) (born 1938), American electrochemical engineer
John Newman (sculptor) (born 1952), New York sculptor
John M. Newman, American Army intelligence officer and historian
John Newman (singer) (born 1990), English singer
John S. Newman, American TV soap writer

See also
Jack Newman (disambiguation)
Jonathan Newman (disambiguation)
John Neumann (disambiguation)
Joseph Newman (disambiguation)